Events from the year 1609 in Sweden

Incumbents
 Monarch – Charles IX

Events

 - Battle of Kamenka.
 - Battle of Torzhok.
 - First Battle of Tver.
 - Second Battle of Tver.
 - Battle of Kaljazin.
 - Battle of Troitsko.
 - Charles XI is partially paralyzed by a stroke.

Births

Deaths

 
 
 29 September - Ebba Månsdotter (Lilliehöök), notorious countess and country administrator  (born 1529) 
 25 March - Olaus Martini, archbishop  (born 1557)

References

 
Years of the 17th century in Sweden
Sweden